The Boy Who Came Back From Heaven: A True Story is a best-selling 2010 Christian book that purported to tell the story of Alex Malarkey's experiences in heaven after a traffic accident in 2004. It was published by Tyndale House Publishers in 2010. Alex's father Kevin Malarkey is credited as a co-author along with Alex, although Kevin holds sole copyright. The book was a commercial success, selling over a million copies. It was adapted into a television film in March 2010.

Since publication, Alex Malarkey and his mother Beth have disavowed the book. Alex commented online in 2011 that it was "one of the most deceptive books ever", and wrote an extensive repudiation in an open letter to Christian bookstores in 2015, describing his near-death experience as a fabrication. As a result, Tyndale House removed the book from print, and many Christian bookstores removed it from their shelves.

Accident and recovery 
On November 14, 2004, six-year old Alex Malarkey and his father Kevin were involved in a car accident on a highway near Rushsylvania, Ohio. He suffered various injuries in the accident, including a severe spinal injury, severe neck injuries, and brain trauma, was left a quadriplegic, and was in a coma for two months. During his recovery, Alex told his parents stories of visions of heaven that he had supposedly seen —the parents recounted some of these on a recovery blog but these did not attract significant media attention.

In 2009, Alex Malarkey, aged 10, became the youngest person to have the surgical procedure first carried out for Christopher Reeve to allow him to breathe on his own without a ventilator. Later in 2009, he was able to stand upright in a supporting frame and, with helpers moving his legs, to walk on a treadmill.

Summary
The book describes supernatural visions and experiences that purportedly occurred to Alex immediately after the accident and during his recovery. These include an out-of-body experience where he saw his father being caught and carried to safety by an angel after flying out of the window of the car. The book says that soon after that he felt an angel take him through the gates of Heaven, which he describes as being "tall", to meet Jesus, who appears through a "hole in heaven". The devil also features multiple times. The book recounts several trips to heaven and back.

Tyndale House promoted the book as "a supernatural encounter that will give you new insights on Heaven, angels, and hearing the voice of God".

Publication and reception 
Beth Malarkey later stated that her husband Kevin got the idea for writing the book after the media attention received in 2009 regarding Alex's surgery and that she resisted him bringing literary agent Matt Jacobson to meet their son. A book deal was signed by the end of the year, which gave Kevin exclusive copyright. Kevin was the book's main promoter, giving many talks and interviews.

Books about purported visits to Heaven make up a popular and highly lucrative genre of religious books in the United States. The 2004 book 90 Minutes in Heaven spent over five years on the New York Times best-seller list and sold over six million copies, while the book Heaven Is for Real has sold over 10 million copies and the film adaptation earned $101 million at the box office. The Boy Who Came Back from Heaven sold 112,386 copies in the first year, and received a platinum award from the Evangelical Christian Publishers Association in 2013 for over a million sales.

According to paranormal researcher Benjamin Radford, part of the reason that the story was so well-received and accepted among its American Christian audience is that it reinforced their existing narratives and beliefs. By sticking closely to a widely accepted interpretation of heaven, God and demons, Malarkey was assured that his story would meet his audience's expectations and be popular.

Repudiation 
In November 2011, Alex commented on a fanpage regarding the book that it was "1 of the most deceptive books ever." This comment was deleted by the page's moderators shortly afterwards and Alex was banned from the page.

In November 2012, Alex's mother, Beth Malarkey, wrote several blog posts saying that her family is not in agreement with the content of the book.  She expressed frustration with several people calling and visiting their home over the years, saying, "[Alex] is just a boy not a statue to be worshipped or person with some supernatural gifts," and, "He does not go to Heaven, have conversations with supernatural beings, and whatever visions/experiences he has had or had not had, is up to him as to what he will do with those."  Later that month, she claimed the book's account had been embellished, adding that, "The truth is getting twisted, distorted, and packaged to be sold to the highest bidder." Beth and Kevin Malarkey have become estranged since the book was published.

On May 9, 2014, Beth Malarkey appeared on the Christian radio show, The Bible Answer Man, and said that the book is deceptive and embellishes the story of the accident. Beth Malarkey said Alex is still a quadriplegic, and cannot legally receive any money from the book. She also began communicating with Phil Johnson, the executive director of John F. MacArthur's media ministry, Grace to You, in hopes of communicating her story. Johnson said that Beth had told him she and Alex had been trying to publicize for some time that the book was "an   exaggeration and an embellishment." Johnson subsequently revealed in his blog, The Spurgeon Archive, that Beth Malarkey had sent Tyndale "a stack of correspondence" in which she stated that Alex not only received no royalties from the book, but that Kevin "neglects his duties as a husband and a father" and was "not even adequately supporting his family financially." She had also revealed this to apologist Justin Peters, who proceeded to e-mail LifeWay leaders Ed Stetzer and Thom S. Rainer. They responded, but the book would not be withdrawn from LifeWay stores for another eight months 

On January 13, 2015, Alex Malarkey released an open letter to Christian publishers and bookstores via the Christian Apologetics blog known as Pulpit and Pen, confessing that the entire account of his journey to Heaven was fictional, and implored them to remove the book from their stores. In his letter he notes:

On January 15, 2015, Tyndale House confirmed it would be withdrawing the book.

Kevin Malarkey did not speak publicly after his son retracted the book's claims and rebuffed efforts by journalists to contact him until a Slate interview in 2019. He told Ruth Graham that he stood by the book. He had not spoken previously because, after prayer, he believed God did not want him to since it would harm his children. He claimed that royalties from the book had come to approximately a million dollars, half of it from the advance, but most of it had been spent on Alex's care, or given to his church and other Christian charities, and none of it was left.

Lawsuits
In 2018, Alex Malarkey filed a lawsuit against Tyndale House, the main publisher based in suburban Chicago, accusing them of charges including defamation and exploitation, seeking an award at least equivalent to the book's profits. That same year Kevin and Beth ended their marriage, with Beth getting custody of Alex (now an adult) and the couple's other children going to live with their father. Beth says she and Alex are in a difficult financial situation and cannot guarantee that they will be able to remain in their house; she would like an accounting of how Kevin spent the money from the book.

See also
 23 Minutes in Hell, 2006 book by Bill Wiese recounting what the author believes were his experiences in Hell in 1998
 Eben Alexander, author of the 2012 book Proof of Heaven: A Neurosurgeon's Journey into the Afterlife
 Howard Storm, author of the book My Descent Into Death about his near-death experience
 List of religious hoaxes
 Pam Reynolds case
 Media magnate Kerry Packer, on his experience of being clinically dead for six minutes after a heart attack.
 Bart's Not Dead, a 2018 episode of The Simpsons in which Bart claims to have seen heaven after a near-death experience

References

External links
 Official Book Site (archived at Internet Archive)
 Dancing Past The Dark website (by Nancy Evans Bush)

2010 non-fiction books
Christian literature
Heaven in popular culture
Literary forgeries
Books about near-death experiences
Recalled publications
Religious hoaxes
Tyndale House books
Controversies in Christian literature
Non-fiction books adapted into films